Mary Burks may refer to:
 Mary Fair Burks, American educator, scholar, and activist
 Mary Ivy Burks, American environmental activist
 Mary Burks, vocalist with The Ikettes